Zone of the Dead, also known as Apocalypse of the Dead is a 2009 Serbian horror film directed by Milan Konjević and Milan Todorović. It stars Ken Foree.

Plot

In 1986, in Chernobyl, a mass grave of bodies is discovered, resembling victims of the Plague. The Chief of Bureau arrives at the scene and is informed that a man cut himself on a corpse’s ribcage and died of infection minutes after. Seconds later, that same man rises up and attacks them both.

Twenty years later, a local professor is trying to catch a train out of Pancevo, Serbia, but finds that all railroads have been closed down as part of a military exercise. While he tries to make a call, a train comes in carrying a deadly biohazard agent monitored by a scientist in a hazmat suit, who asks for permission to pass through. Before he can, a trio of drunken off-duty soldiers emerge and harass the station guard, taking his weapon and inadvertently rupturing the tank, releasing the chemical agent into the atmosphere. All the soldiers and the station guard are infected by the gas, becoming zombies, but the professor manages to escape.

Meanwhile, INTERPOL Agent Mina Milieus is tasked with transporting a mysterious prisoner from Serbia to Belgrave while under the supervision of Agent Mortimer “Morty” Reyes, an ex-CIA agent and on the verge of retiring, along with his partner, Inspector Dragan “Dra” Belic. While Mina is in awe of Morty, she is also nervous as this is her first assignment in the field. Morty assures her that she will be fine, considering this to be the easiest assignment he has ever had.

The Chief of Bureau meets with the President and informs him about the accident at the train station in Pancevo. He discloses that the agent in the tank was capable of reanimating dead cells and advises that he not bother with evacuation but contain the incident and let the National Guard deal with the rest.

Back in Pancevo, a young reporter named Jan is wasting his time at a minor concert, and is eventually convinced by his girlfriend Angela to leave along with her friend, Jovana. At the same time, the professor is trying to escape the growing number of infected. He comes across another escaped felon, Armageddon, who states the End of Days has arrived, and he has made it his personal mission to eradicate the zombies. The professor runs away and meets Jan and the girls, who allow him to come into their car.

The two INTERPOL vans arrive in Pancevo just as the driver, Petrovic, hits a zombie. When they go out to investigate, several more arrive, separating them from Agents Bottin and Savini. They attempt to contact Headquarters for backup, but there is no signal. Upon finding the second van, containing the Prisoner, Morty finds Bottin and Savini are dead with more zombies coming. The Prisoner tells them to shoot the zombies in the head, which proves to be successful, but they are quickly overwhelmed: Petrovic is devoured, and Dra is bitten on the hand. They are forced to take shelter in a nearby abandoned police station with little choice.

While reconnoitering the area, Morty and Dra find the professor, Jan, and the girls and bring them back to the reception. The Prisoner attempts to flirt with Mina, but she rebuffs him, although she is put off by how he knew she was a rookie. Meanwhile, Armageddon continues his rampage on the zombies, using multiple weapons at his disposal. He enters a local TV Station and broadcasts his declaration of the apocalypse to Pancevo, including the station. Realizing the gravity of the situation, Morty decides to activate the generator and find a way out. Dra is unable to come with him and has begun to succumb to infection, resulting in Morty freeing the Prisoner and taking him along. After turning the power on, several zombies break in and nearly kill Morty, but the Prisoner saves him. Dra subsequently dies and reanimates, forcing Mina to shoot him. Jovana, driven insane by the turn of events, breaks down the barricade, allowing herself to be eaten. The professor also chooses death by Morty’s gun, as opposed to being eaten.

The group escapes and heads towards the river through the train tunnels. The Prisoner reveals to Mina that he knows of the zombies because his father was one of them due to the incident in Chernobyl. He goes on to explain the President will most likely ‘cleanse’ the city to prevent the spread of infection. Upon arriving at the shipyards, they find a horde of sleeping zombies which the Hazmat zombie awakes. Morty leads the zombies away while the rest of the group makes for the boat. Morty runs out of ammo and gets trapped inside a train, while Jan takes the boat and abandons Angela. Just as she is about to be eaten, Armageddon arrives and supplies the group with weapons; Mina with a rifle, and the Prisoner with a broadsword. The three proceed to kill the zombies while Morty escapes the train, taking a gun from the Prisoner and helping them out. Armageddon finishes off the undead, and the Prisoner decapitates the Hazmat zombie, apparently ending the threat.

Later, the President announces that he will cooperate with NATO to bring all those responsible for the bioweapon to justice, much to The Chief of Bureau’s chagrin. The President considers his decision to be “a necessary evil” and expects the Chief to resign, effective immediately. Mina allows the Prisoner to leave, despite having some ammo in her guns, showing respect for him. Morty congratulates her on her efforts despite the mission not being completed, saying he messed up his first one as well. Milo asks who the Prisoner was, to which Morty replies: “Nobody special.”

Armageddon completes his prophecy as they leave, possibly answering Mina’s question: “And he shall raise his hands with the Sword of Vengeance. The Flaming Blade of the Lord’s Retribution. And his eyes were as a flame of fire… And he had a name written… which no man knoweth but himself.”

In the final scene, Jan has taken the boat up the river, only for it to run out of gas. As he heads to a cabin to look for more, the infected captain lurches out and tackles them both into the river.

Cast

Release
The film was released on February 22, 2009. On 1 March 2010 Metrodome released the DVD in the UK and Ireland as Apocalypse of the Dead. On 1 September 2012 Epic Pictures released it on DVD in North America as Apocalypse of the Dead.

Sequel
Zone of the Dead 2 has been planned since 2009.

References

External links 

2009 films
2000s English-language films
English-language Serbian films
Serbian independent films
Serbian zombie films
2009 horror films
Serbian horror films
Serbian science fiction films
Films set in Serbia
2000s exploitation films
Serbian action films
2000s science fiction horror films
2009 science fiction action films
2000s action horror films
Italian splatter films